Sophie Elizabeth Porley (born c. 1988) is an English actress and model, known for her role as Ellie Nightingale in the Channel 4 soap opera Hollyoaks. Before starring in Hollyoaks, she had roles in The Work Experience and Jupiter Ascending, and has also modelled for Bravissimo, Tu for Sainsbury's, and Royce Lingerie.

Filmography

Awards and nominations

References

External links
 
 Sophie Porley at Storm Models

Living people
Year of birth missing (living people)
English television actresses
English stage actresses
English soap opera actresses
English female models